Cymbella is a diatom genus in the family Cymbellaceae including over 800 species.

Species

References

External links

Cymbellales
Diatom genera